Chiara Aurelia de Braconier d'Alphen (born September 13, 2002) is an American actress. She began her career as a child actress in the films Gerald's Game and Back Roads. She stars as Jeanette Turner in the Freeform teen drama series Cruel Summer.

Early life
Aurelia was born in Taos, New Mexico to Frederic de Braconier d'Alphen and Claudia Kleefeld. De Braconier d'Alphen, who died when Aurelia was three, was from Leuven, Belgium, the great nephew of Édouard Empain and a descendant of Peter Paul Rubens. Kleefield is the daughter of singer and actor Tony Travis/Kleefeld and author and poet Carolyn Mary Kleefeld, and the granddaughter of builder Mark Taper, of the Mark Taper Forum. Her mother's family is Jewish. Aurelia has an older sister in England.

Aurelia grew up in Albuquerque. She began acting in school productions and local drama classes when she was five. From the age of 11, she split her time between Albuquerque and Los Angeles pursuing her career. She studied at the Lee Strasberg Institute.

Career
Aurelia began her career as a child actress with small film and television roles as well as appearances in short films such as Dead Celebrity (2014). She played a younger version of Carla Gugino's character in the 2017 film adaptation of Stephen King's Gerald's Game, and portrayed Misty Altmyer in Alex Pettyfer's 2018 directorial debut Back Roads, both earned her Young Entertainer Awards.

In 2021, Aurelia began starring as Jeanette Turner in the Freeform series Cruel Summer as well as playing Rose Lord in the TNT series Tell Me Your Secrets. She also appeared in the film Fear Street Part Two: 1978. For her performance in Cruel Summer, Aurelia received HCA and Critics' Choice Award nominations. In July 2021, it was announced Aurelia had joined the cast of the Netflix film adaptation of Luckiest Girl Alive by Jessica Knoll.

Filmography

Film

Television

Awards and nominations

References

External links

Living people
2002 births
21st-century American actresses
Actresses from Albuquerque, New Mexico
Actresses from New Mexico
American child actresses
American people of Belgian descent
American people of English-Jewish descent
American people of German-Jewish descent
American people of Polish-Jewish descent
American people of Russian-Jewish descent
People from Taos, New Mexico